George C. Cleveland (March 10, 1874 – January 19, 1935) served in the California State Assembly for the 54th district from 1905 to 1907 and the 43rd district from 1921 to 1927. He served in the California State Senate for the 11th district from 1929 to 1933. During the Spanish–American War, he served in the United States Army.

References

External links

Canadian military personnel of World War I
American military personnel of the Spanish–American War
Republican Party California state senators
Republican Party members of the California State Assembly
1874 births
1935 deaths
20th-century American politicians